Rutland is an unincorporated community in Lake County, South Dakota, United States.

Rutland was laid out in 1906, and named after Rutland Township.

Rutland is served by the Rutland School District, which has a single Pre-K through 12 school located in the town.

References

Unincorporated communities in Lake County, South Dakota
Unincorporated communities in South Dakota